A rajkulo is a type of canal found in Nepal. It provides water for Irrigation, dhunge dharas, and ponds, and it can be dated back to the Lichhavi era.

Notable rajkulos 
 Tikabhairav Canal transports water from Lele and Naldu rivers to the Patan Durbar Square complex.
 Bageswori Canal that brings water to Bhaktapur.
 Budhikanta Canal that brings water to Kathmandu.

See also 

 Dhunge dhara

References

External links 
 A neglected rajkulo of Lalitpur

Architecture in Nepal
Water supply and sanitation in Nepal
Water supply infrastructure in Nepal
Nepalese culture
Canals
Canals in Nepal